Cheragh Hesari (also Romanized as Cherāgh Ḩeşārī; also known as Chirāgh Hisari and Chirag-Khissari) is a village in Aq Bolagh Rural District, Sojas Rud District, Khodabandeh County, Zanjan Province, Iran. At the 2006 census, its population was 142, in 38 families.

References 

Populated places in Khodabandeh County